Stian Barsnes-Simonsen (born 20 April 1979, in Bergen) is a Norwegian actor and television host of Amigo, Midt i smørøyet and Melodi Grand Prix.

Filmography

Television 
Presenter
De ukjente (2009)
Gullruten (2006)
Melodi Grand Prix 2006 and 2007 (with Synnøve Svabø)
Junior Eurovision Song Contest 2004 (with Nadia Hasnaoui)
Smørøyet (1998)
Melodi Grand Prix Junior 2002 (with Thomas Numme) 
Melodi Grand Prix Junior 2003
Melodi Grand Prix Junior 2004, Melodi Grand Prix Junior 2005 and Melodi Grand Prix Junior 2006 (with Nadia Hasnaoui)
Melodi Grand Prix Junior 2007
Melodi Grand Prix Junior 2008
MGP Nordic 2007 (with Nadia Hasnaoui)
MGP Nordic 2002 (with Camilla Ottesen, Josefine Sundström)
Eurovision Song Contest 2008 (as spokesperson for Norway).
Eurovision Song Contest 2009 (as spokesperson for Norway).

Acting 
Hotel Cæsar (1998–2000, television series)
Bølgene (English title: Waves, 1998)
Kysset som fikk snøen til å smelte (English title: A Kiss in the Snow, 1997)

Bibliography 
How to be ungdom (2004, Aschehoug)
En faktahest om forelskelse (-og kyssing) (2008, Aschehoug)
Gnøkkel og Fnøkkel og det synkende tonometer (2014, Aschehoug)

References

External links 

1979 births
Living people
Norwegian male soap opera actors
Norwegian television presenters
NRK people
Norwegian male television actors